São Miguel (Portuguese for Saint Michael) is a parish in the municipality of Vila Franca do Campo in the Azores. The population in 2011 was 2,659, in an area of 12.60 km².

History
On July 2002, the settlement of Ribeira Seca split from São Miguel and became an independent parish.

References

Freguesias of Vila Franca do Campo (Azores)